Hablerud Rural District is in the Central District of Firuzkuh County, Tehran province, Iran. At the National Census of 2006, its population was 4,884 in 1,518 households. There were 3,983 inhabitants in 1,537 households at the following census of 2011. At the most recent census of 2016, the population of the rural district was 2,883 in 1,263 households. The largest of its 18 villages was Hesar Bon, with 439 people.

References 

Firuzkuh County

Rural Districts of Tehran Province

Populated places in Tehran Province

Populated places in Firuzkuh County